Sir Frederick Arthur Bishop CB CVO (4 December 1915 - 2 March 2005), sometimes called Freddie Bishop, was a British civil servant who served as Principal Private Secretary to the Prime Minister of the United Kingdom, 1956–59.

References 
Plowden, William. "Bishop, Sir Frederick Arthur". Oxford Dictionary of National Biogarphy. Oxford University Press. 2013. Pages 105 and 106.
John Ramsden (ed). "Bishop, Frederick Arthur". The Oxford Companion to Twentieth-century British Politics. Oxford University Press. 2002. Page 56.
"Bishop, Frederick Arthur". Debrett's Peerage, Baronetage, Knightage, and Companionage. Kelly's Directories. 1969. Page 1249.
"Bishop, Sir Frederick Arthur". Debrett's People of Today 2002. p 176.
"Bishop , Frederick Arthur". The Berlin Crisis, 1958-1962. National Security Archive and Chadwyck-Healey. 1992. Page 171.
"Sir Frederick Bishop". The Times. 5 April 2005.
"Sir Frederick Bishop". The Daily Telegraph. 14 March 2005.
Andrew Holt and Warren Dockter (eds). Private Secretaries to the Prime Minister. Routledge. 2017. Pages PT323, PT324, PT330 and passim. (Pages 2, 5, 35, 36, 39 to 42, 47, 59, 190).
Kevin Theakston. Leadership in Whitehall. Pages 103, 112, 129 and 133.
D R Thorpe. Eden: The Life and Times of Anthony Eden, First Earl of Avon, 1897-1977. Chatto & Windus. 2003. Pages xii, 443, 498, 522.
D R Thorpe. Supermac: The Life of Harold Macmillan. Pimlico. 2011. Pages 282, 377, 387, 472, 515, 580, 733 and 794.
Alistair Horne. Macmillan: 1957-1986. Macmillan. 1988. Pages 11, 43, 94 to 96, 126, 150, 160, 161, 284, 339 and 494.
Charles Williams. Harold Macmillan. Weidenfeld & Nicolson. 2009. Pages 280, 282, 293, 308, 313, 356 and 375.
Richard Aldous and Sabine Lee (eds). Harold Macmillan and Britain’s World Role. Macmillan Press. St Martin's Press. 1996. Pages 14, 15 and 150.
Constantine A Pagedas. Anglo-American Strategic Relations and the French Problem, 1960-1963. Frank Cass. 2000. Routledge. 2013. Pages 45 to 47, 54, 74, 89, 90, 97, 105, 112, 113, 116 to 118, 120 to 122, 124, 126 to 128,  208, 219, 221 and 222.
Kitty Newman. Macmillan, Khrushchev and the Berlin Crisis, 1958-1960. (Cold War History Series). Routledge. 2007. Pages 12, 13, 47, 48, 53, 63, 70, 169, 194, 198.

1915 births
2005 deaths
British civil servants
Companions of the Order of the Bath
Commanders of the Royal Victorian Order
National Trust people